Chamaepsila is a genus of flies in the family Psilidae.

Species
Subgenus Chamaepsila  Hendel, 1917
C. atra (Meigen, 1826)
C. bicolor (Meigen, 1826)
C. buccata (Fallén, 1826)
C. clunalis (Collin, 1944)
C. humeralis (Zetterstedt, 1847)
C. limbatella (Zetterstedt, 1847)
C. luteola (Collin, 1944)
C. nigra (Fallén, 1820)
C. nigricornis (Meigen, 1826)
C. pallida (Fallén, 1820)
C. persimilis (Wakerley, 1959)
C. rosae (Fabricius, 1794)
Subgenus Tetrapsila Frey, 1925
C. obscuritarsis (Loew, 1856)

References

Psilidae
Schizophora genera